The White Pine Series of Architectural Monographs, subtitled "A Bi-Monthly Publication Suggesting the Architectural Use of White Pine and Its Availability Today as a Structural Wood", was a landmark publication of drawings, photographs and descriptions of early American architecture. The original series was first published in 1915 and was out of print by World War II; it was revived from 2006 to 2014. Both the original series and revival were discovered to have published content based on fabricated New England communities.

History
The series was launched in 1915 as an advertising campaign by the White Pine Bureau, a joint venture of the Northern Pine Manufacturer's Association of Minnesota, Wisconsin and Michigan and the Associated White Pine Manufacturers of Idaho. Architect Russell F. Whitehead was hired to supervise the series with Julian Buckly as photographer.

During the first 10 years, the series was limited to the exterior details of residences constructed with Eastern white pine, as suited its advertising purpose. Often the notable structures of a single village would be documented together in one issue. By 1920, the editor's collection of unpublished photographs became so extensive that Whitehead and his colleague Hubert Ripley invented the fictional town of Stotham, Massachusetts, to justify their use. The fiction went undiscovered until the late 1940s when Leicester Bodine Holland, head of the Library of Congress' Department of Fine Arts related his inability to locate the town to Whitehead, eliciting an explanation of the subterfuge.

In 1924, the White Pine Bureau ceased its advertising campaign and Whitehead determined to continue the series independently, selling advertising space to Weyerhauser Forest Products. He also modified the focus of the series, including documentation of churches and public buildings and the recording of interiors and millwork details. He also expanded the geographic scope of the project, documenting buildings in the southern states, many of which had been framed with Southern pine or Cypress.

In 1932, the Monograph series became absorbed into the Pencil Points architectural journal as a regular feature. The documentation of historic structures with photographs and measured drawings complemented the "Comparative Details" feature which published construction details for contemporary projects. The Monograph series was ended abruptly in June 1940. Many of its contributors became involved in the Historic American Buildings Survey.

Re-issue and revival
Eagerly collected by architects and historians, the monographs have been re-issued in bound editions several times. In 1987, the National Historical Society of Harrisburg, Pennsylvania, began publishing a series of hardbound books, the Architectural Treasures of Early America, drawn entirely from the White Pine Monographs. They reorganized the individual editions into geographic regions and re-set all the type in order to produce a consistent presentation.  They were also able, in many cases, to make use of the original photographs which had been given to Weyerhauser by Whitehead's widow.

In 2006, the Northeastern Lumber Manufacturers Association (NELMA) revived the title for a new series of publications documenting the production and use of Eastern white pine lumber in construction. In 2011, another hoax was discovered; similar to the 1920s hoax about Stotham, Massachusetts, a 2010 monograph discussing the town of New Milford, New Hampshire, was found to have been a fabrication. The series has not been published since 2014.

References

Sources
 Magruder, C. (March, 1963). “The White Pine Monograph Series.“ The Journal of the Society of Architectural Historians. 22(1): pp. 39–41
 Davis, William C. (1987) "Historical Introduction to the Series." Survey of Early American Design, Vol. 1 of Lisa C. Mullins, ed., Architectural Treasures of Early America. Harrisburg, Pennsylvania. pp. 5–7

External links

 

Advertising campaigns
Architecture magazines
Publications established in 1915
Architecture books
1987 non-fiction books